José Manuel Rivera Galván is a Mexican former professional footballer who has played in 6 different countries in highest level in Europe, (Finland, Hungary and Slovakia) Mexico, United States and El Salvador being with Sonsonate FC his last team in 2018.

Club career 

He signed with FC Spartak Trnava in August 2006 as a free agent. Not much is known about Manuel Rivera. He spent time in the youth league teams of Club Atlas and C.F. Pachuca. Having little opportunity to show what he is capable of on these two teams, he was forced to travel to Europe in search of a contract. He had try-outs during the course of a month with teams from the Netherlands, France, and Germany. He tried their second, third, and fourth divisions, until finally, his agent received a call for Rivera to go and try-out for the Slovakian club FC Spartak Trnava.

He arrived at the club on 4 August 2006 to practice with the B team. On the very next Tuesday, he got to play in a friendly match with the A team against a club team from Kuwait. They told him that this was his only opportunity to show what he is made of and that if you play well you stay, if not you go. He entered in the second half of the game and ended up scoring two goals. His signing with the team was very quick after that and he made his league debut against Inter Bratislava where he played 27 minutes and had an assist. In the match against FC Artmedia Petrzalka 27 August 2006 scored one goal from penalty kick.
For the 2007 season he will played for Chiapas of the Primera División (First Division) on loan. The following season, he played on another loan with Club Toluca in the First Division. In the summer of 2009 he signed with Deportivo Guamúchil in Mexico.

RoPS
On 4 April 2011 Rivera signed a contract with Finnish club Rovaniemen Palloseura after have pass a time with Deportivo Guamúchil.
Rivera debuted with RoPS on May 6 in a victory 1–0 against FF Jaro and on May 9 he scored his first 2 goals in a draw 3–3 against IFK Mariehamn. Rivera have tried to get contract from Scandinavia and might be back in Rovaniemi 2012.

CD Guadalajara 
Jose Manuel Rivera is joining C.D. Guadalajara for the 2013 Clausura. He joined after he tried out a few weeks ago and has played in the winter 2012 preseason for Guadalajara. He also tried out in September 2012, but did not end up playing.

Chivas USA 
He spent with the 2013 season with Chivas USA in Major League Soccer.

FF Jaro
After a short spell with CD Irapuato in the Ascenso MX, Rivera returned to the Finnish top flight, signing a contract with FF Jaro in April 2015. He made his debut on April 23 in a defeat against Seinäjoen Jalkapallokerho.

Career statistics

Club

References

External links
 

Mexican expatriate footballers
Mexican footballers
Atlas F.C. footballers
C.F. Pachuca players
FC Spartak Trnava players
Slovak Super Liga players
Expatriate footballers in Slovakia
Mexican expatriate sportspeople in Slovakia
Budapest Honvéd FC players
Expatriate footballers in Hungary
Mexican expatriate sportspeople in Hungary
Rovaniemen Palloseura players
Veikkausliiga players
Ykkönen players
Expatriate footballers in Finland
Mexican expatriate sportspeople in Finland
Expatriate soccer players in the United States
Mexican expatriate sportspeople in the United States
Footballers from Guadalajara, Jalisco
Deportivo Toluca F.C. players
Chiapas F.C. footballers
Chivas USA players
FC Arizona players
Major League Soccer players
National Premier Soccer League players
Living people
1986 births
Association football midfielders